The following is a list of English-language pop songs based on French-language songs.  The songs here were originally written and performed in the French language.  Later, new, English-language lyrics were set to the same melody as the original song.  Songs are arranged in alphabetical order, omitting the articles "a" and "the".

A
"About The Time" - "Avec le temps" (Translation: "With Time") 
"Amsterdam" (On The Port of Amsterdam) - "Amsterdam (Sur le port d'Amsterdam)" (Translation: "Amsterdam (On The Port of Amsterdam)")
"Antisocial" - "Antisocial" (Translation: "Antisocial")
"Autumn Leaves" - "Les feuilles mortes" (Translation: "Dead Leaves")

B
"The Ballad Of Melody Nelson" - "La Ballade de Melody Nelson" (Translation: "The Ballad Of Melody Nelson")
"Beyond The Sea" - "La Mer" (Translation: "The Sea")

C
"Cherry Pink and Apple Blossom White" - "Cerisier Rose et Pommier Blanc" (Translation: "Cherry Pink and Apple Blossom White")
"Chick Habit" - "Laisse Tomber les Filles" (Translation: "Chick Habit")

D
"Don't U Feel The Beat" - "Les Divas Du Dancing" (Translation: "Dance Hall Divas")

E
"Emotion" - "Amoureuse" (Translation: "In Love")

F
"A Fair Affair" - "Je t'aime, moi non plus" (Translation: "I Love You, Nor Do I") 
"Feelings" - "Pour toi" (1950s song, later amended to "Dis lui" - Translation: "Tell Her")

G
"Girl Talk" - "Dansez sur moi" (Translation: "Dance On Me") 
"The Good Life" - "La Belle Vie" (Translation: "The Good Life")

I
"I Will Wait for You" - "Non je ne pourrai jamais vivre sans toi" (Translation: "I will never be able to live without you")
"I Wish You Love" - "Que reste-t-il de nos amours" (Translation: "What Is Left of Our Loves?")
"If I Only Had Time" - "Je n'aurai pas le temps" (Translation: "I Won't Have Time")
"If That's What It Takes" - "Pour que tu m'aimes encore" (Translation: So That You'll Still Love Me)  
"If You Go Away" - "Ne Me Quitte Pas" (Translation: "Don't Leave Me")
"If You Love Me (Really Love Me)" - "Hymne a l'amour" (Translation: "Love Hymn")

L
"Let It Be Me" - "Je t'appartiens" (Translation: "I Belong To You")
"Let Me Try Again" - "Laisse Moi Le Temps- (Translation: "Let Me The Time")
 "Little Jim Brown" ("The Three Bells") - "Les trois cloches"

M
"My Boy" - "Parce que je t’aime mon enfant" (Translation: "Because I Love You Child")
"My Man" - "Mon homme" (Translation: "My Man")
"My Sweetest Pain" - "Ma Douce Folie Amère" (Translation: "My Bittersweet Craziness")
"My Way" - "Comme d'habitude" (Translation: "As Usual")

N
"Natural" - "Tous les maux d'amour" (Translation: "All Love Aches")

S
"Seasons In The Sun" - "Le Moribond" (Translation: "The Moribund One")
"Solitaire" - "Solitaire" (Translation: "Solitary")
"Song For Old Lovers" - "La Chanson des Vieux Amants" (Translation: "The Song of Old Lovers")

T
"Too Lost in You" - "Quand j'ai peur de tout" (Translation: "When Everything Scares Me")
"Two Loves Have I" - "J'ai deux amours" (Translation: "I've Got Two Loves")

W
"What Now My Love" - "Et maintenant" (Translation: "And Now")
"The Windmills Of Your Mind" - "Les moulins de mon coeur" (Translation: "The Windmills Of My Heart")

Y
"Yesterday, When I Was Young" - "Hier Encore" (Translation: "Yesterday Again")
"You're Too Dangerous, Chérie" - "La Vie En Rose" (Translation: "Life In Pink")

English-language pop songs based on French-language songs